Argyrolopha is a genus of moths of the family Noctuidae.

Species
Argyrolopha costibarbata  Hampson, 1914
Argyrolopha punctilinea  Prout, 1921
Argyrolopha trisignata  (Mabille, 1900)

References
Natural History Museum Lepidoptera genus database

Catocalinae